Mount Saint Anne – peak 593 m a.s.l. is a mountain in Poland. located in north-west part of Krzeszowskie Wzgórza, near Kamiengorian Valley (pl. Kotlina Kamiennogórska), in Central Sudeten (pl. Sudety Środkowe).

Geology 

The summits are made up of old, upper cretaceous sandstone, glauconite and mud stones. Coming down towards the north side are sandstone and conglomerates of rot legend.

Vegetation 
The apex, as well as the majority of bands are covered with pine forest and west stretch meadows.

Chapel of Saint Anne 
Below the summit, on the western side the mountain lies a baroque chapel of St. Anna dating to 1623. The chapel was destroyed in the second half of the twentieth century, however the inhabitants of Krzeszów rebuilt the chapel in the second decade of the twenty-first century.

Sources

References 

Mountain peaks of the Krzeszowskie Wzgórza